ASi-Profile is a 3D-CAD add-on application for Autodesk Inventor developed by company ITB Paul Schneider.

Uses
The software aims to extend the field of application of Autodesk Inc.'s CAD software Autodesk Inventor, which is usually used for mechanical construction in mechanical engineering and plant engineering. ASi-Profile enables the user to create supporting structures, substructures, control- and maintenance platforms, stairways, barriers, etc. which are typical elements in the constructional steelwork area.

Use in mechanical engineering, plant engineering
Conventional 3D CAD systems for mechanical engineering usually lack of functions to create steel constructions. As an add-on application, the software tries to fill the gap between mechanical engineering and constructional steelworking, enabling the designer, for example, to create a supporting frame for a machine or the required maintenance platform in the same software.

Use in locksmithing, metal fabrication
The scope in locksmithing and metal fabrication is often to plan and design stairways, platforms, balconies or railings, etc., with the intention of creating a customized, individual structure, setting a special focus on its design. ASi-Profile is used to simplify the construction process and to create realistic views of the structures.

Distribution, Platforms
The software is being used and distributed worldwide by local dealers, who assume user training and support.

Available for:
 Base software: Autodesk Inventor 5 to 2016
 Operating systems: Windows Win7 und Win8/8.1 (32 + 64 Bit)

Version history
 2000: First version 1.0.0 for Inventor 5
 2009: Version 9.0.x for Inventor 2010
 2010: Version 10.0.x for Inventor 2011
 2011: Version 12.0.x for Inventor 2012
 2012: version 13.2.n for Inventor 2013
 2013: version 14.1.n for Inventor 2014
 2014: version 15.0.n for Inventor 2015
 2015: version 16.0.n for Inventor 2016

Notes

External links
Official Website
Aertist Website

3D graphics software